Efthymis Christopoulos (born 20 September 2000) is a Greek professional footballer who plays as a forward for Super League 2 club AEK Athens B.

References

2000 births
Living people
Greek footballers
Greece under-21 international footballers
Greece youth international footballers
Super League Greece players
AEK Athens F.C. players
Association football forwards
Footballers from Patras
AEK Athens F.C. B players